Gymnopilus oregonensis is a species of mushroom in the family Hymenogastraceae.

Description

Habitat and distribution
Gymnopilus oregonensis has been found growing on conifer logs in Oregon, in November.

See also
List of Gymnopilus species

References

External links
Gymnopilus oregonensis at Index Fungorum

oregonensis
Fungi of North America
Taxa named by William Alphonso Murrill